Al Herman (March 15, 1926 – June 18, 1960) was an American racecar driver.

Born in Topton, Pennsylvania, Herman died in West Haven, Connecticut as a result of injuries sustained in a midget car crash at the West Haven Speedway.  Herman was involved in a multi-car crash on the first lap of the feature race and his car rolled.  He drove in the American Automobile Association (AAA) and United States Automobile Club (USAC) Championship Car series, racing in the 1955-1957 and 1959–1960 seasons with 11 starts, including the Indianapolis 500 races in each of those years.  He finished in the top ten 3 times, with his best finish in 7th position, in the 1955 Indianapolis 500, earning him Rookie of the Year.

Indianapolis 500 results

World Championship career summary
The Indianapolis 500 was part of the FIA World Championship from 1950 through 1960. Drivers competing at Indy during those years were credited with World Championship points and participation. Al Herman participated in 5 World Championship races. He started on the pole 0 times, won 0 races, set 0 fastest laps, and finished on the podium 0 times. He accumulated a total of 0 championship points.

References

1926 births
1960 deaths
Indianapolis 500 drivers
Indianapolis 500 Rookies of the Year
People from Berks County, Pennsylvania
Racing drivers from Pennsylvania
Racing drivers who died while racing
Sports deaths in Connecticut